Oakville is a provincial electoral district in Ontario, Canada, that has been represented in the Legislative Assembly of Ontario since 1999.

Riding history

It was created in 1996 from parts of Halton Centre and Oakville South ridings.

It consisted initially of the part of the Town of Oakville lying southeast of the Queen Elizabeth Way and Upper Middle Road.

In 2003, it was redefined to consist of the part of the Town of Oakville lying southeast of a line drawn from the northeastern town limit southwest along Dundas Street East, southeast along Eight Line and southwest along Upper Middle Road to the southwestern town limit.

The current boundaries include the neighbourhoods of Lakeshore Woods, Bronte, Hopedale, Coronation Park, Kerr Village, Old Oakville, Eastlake, Glen Abbey, College Park, Iroquois Ridge, Clearview, and Joshua Creek.

Members of Provincial Parliament

Election results

2007 electoral reform referendum

Sources

Elections Ontario Past Election Results
Map of riding for 2018 election

Ontario provincial electoral districts
Politics of Oakville, Ontario